"Little Bit of Life" is a song written by Danny Wells and Tony Mullins, and recorded by American country music artist Craig Morgan. It was released in August 2006 as the lead-off single and title track from his album Little Bit of Life.  The song was a Top Ten hit for him on the Billboard country charts in late 2006-early 2007, peaking at number 7.

Content
"Little Bit of Life" is a moderately up-tempo song in which Morgan lists off the various objects and events that make up his life, preceding each with the words "a little bit of". Morgan also recorded unique versions of the song for various country music stations with the line, "A little bit of radio goin' boom, boom, boom" changed to use the radio station's callsign (e.g. "A little WDRM goin' boom, boom, boom").

Music video
The music video was directed by Wes Edwards and premiered in August 2006.

Chart performance

Year-end charts

References

2006 songs
Craig Morgan songs
2006 singles
BBR Music Group singles
Music videos directed by Wes Edwards
Song recordings produced by Keith Stegall
Songs written by Tony Mullins
Songs written by Danny Wells (songwriter)